Aale or AALE may refer to:

American Academy for Liberal Education, United States educational accreditation organization
Asociación de Academias de la Lengua Española, the entity which regulates the Spanish language
Aale Sariola (1882-1948), Finnish clergyman and politician
Aale Tynni (1913–1997), Finnish poet and translator
Maile Aale (born 1983), Estonian politician
Padali Aale, Indian village